In mathematics, the Kneser theorem can refer to two distinct theorems in the field of ordinary differential equations:

 the first one, named after Adolf Kneser, provides criteria to decide whether a differential equation is oscillating or not;
 the other one, named after Hellmuth Kneser, is about the topology of the set of all solutions of an initial value problem with continuous right hand side.

Statement of the theorem due to A. Kneser 
Consider an ordinary linear homogeneous differential equation of the form

with

continuous.
We say this equation is oscillating if it has a solution y with infinitely many zeros, and non-oscillating otherwise.

The theorem states that the equation is non-oscillating if

and oscillating if

Example 
To illustrate the theorem consider

where  is real and non-zero. According to the theorem, solutions will be oscillating or not depending on whether  is positive (non-oscillating) or negative (oscillating) because 

which gives

This means that (for non-zero ) the general solution is 

It is not hard to see that for positive  the solutions do not oscillate while for negative  the identity

 
  
shows that they do.

The general result follows from this example by the Sturm–Picone comparison theorem.

Extensions 
There are many extensions to this result, such as the Gesztesy–Ünal criterion.

Statement of the theorem due to H. Kneser 
While Peano's existence theorem guarantees the existence of solutions of certain initial values problems with continuous right hand side, H. Kneser's theorem deals with the topology of the set of those solutions. Precisely, H. Kneser's theorem states the following: 

Let  be a continuous function on the region , and such that  for all . 

The set  is a closed and connected set.

References

Ordinary differential equations
Theorems in analysis
Oscillation